

Karlsladen is an old barn from 1727 that was transformed into a visitors centre for Mols Bjerge National Park in 2013. The thatched and timbered building covers 1,000 square meters. Access to the visitors centre is free, and it is open 7 days a week all year. Before restoration the barn was a dilapidated farm building as part of the now publicly owned Kalø Estate.

The exhibition at the visitors centre is unstaffed. Its purpose is to convey aspects of local nature and natural history from Mols Bjerge National Park on the southern part of the Djursland peninsula in Denmark. The main themes are prehistoric times, the Kalø Castle Ruin and wildlife and hunting round Kalø. The latter related to a research station under Aarhus University that is part of the Kalø Estate.
The visitors centre includes a series of posters, a model of the medieval Kalø Castle, and an area for children. Here one can hear taped stories, such as about how the Swedish king, Gustav Vasa, was imprisoned at Kalø Castle in 1518-19, until he escaped from the castle peninsula by wading through the sea during the night at low tide.

Karlsladen is owned by the Danish state under the, Nature Departement, Naturstyrelsen. In 1727 Karlsladen was built as a barn for storing farm crops from the Kalø Estate. As part of the renovation in 2013 the building was given a thatched roof in line with its original roofing. It had been given a tile roof in 1941, which was removed as part of the 2013 renovation.

Until 1945 the Kalø Estate, including Karlsladen, was privately owned by the German Jenisch family from Holstein.
After World War II the Danish State confiscated the Kalø Estate including Karlsladen as part of war compensation. 

Karlsladen is located on Djursland, which is a peninsula protruding from Jutland to the east into the Kattegat Sea. Karlsladen is located close to Kalø Castle Ruin and the town Rønde in Syddjurs Municipality 30 kilometers north-east of Denmark's second largest city, Aarhus.

Restoration 
A colonnade of heavy load bearing oak timber pillars and a visible upper oak-construction inside Karlsladen defines the architecture of the single inner room. As part of the restoration the elongated lofty building was cleared of the remnants of prior use, including the use of  part of the barn as a pig stable for some years, and the division of part of it into a number of floors for storage of grain and sheaves. The result is that the original heavy timber construction all the way up to the thatched roof is visible today. During the restoration it was necessary to replace the first meter of the lower part of many of the load bearing oak pillars due to rot and wear. This was a task that demanded specialized carpentry, giving back the original strength to the construction without compromising the way it was built and looked in 1727.

Funding 
Karsladen was converted to a visitors centre as part of a 40 million kroner (4.78 million £) project, "Ferieoplevelser i Nationalpark Mols Bjerge" - Vacation Experience in Mols Bjerge National Park. The National Park was established in 2009 and covers 180 km². The funding included establishing another visitors centre in the National Park at Øvre Strandkær and other new facilities in the park. These included 6 kayak campsites along the coast of southern Djursland, two horse trailer parking sites, a number of bicycle trails and signposts in the park plus park-folders. The project spanned 4 years. The 40 million kroner came from three public and semipublic sources. Arbejsmarkedets Feriefond provided two thirds of the funding. The state department, Naturstyrelsen, together with Syddjurs Municipality provided the remaining third.

Origin 
The nearly 300 year old barn is built in Holstein style with timbered walls, a wide building, with a pitched and thatched roof. It has been said that the massive inner oak timber might originate from stranded ships in Køge Bay on the east coast of the island Zealand, south of the Danish capital, Copenhagen. Others are of the opinion that the timber might have been reused from a barn that was part of Kalø Castle. A barn supposedly located north of the existing Kalø Caste Ruin on the Kalø peninsula 3 kilometers from Karlsladen. Kalø Castle was abandoned in 1660, but the barn by the castle might still have been there as late as in 1722, five years prior to completion of Karlsladen in the nearby hills.

Use 
After restoration in 2013 it has been attempted to use Karlsladen for different kinds of events, but the building does not seem entirely suitable for many types of gatherings. For a large part the charm of the big room is based on the two visible and massive oak timber colonnades across the whole floor plane, but these hinder a free view through the room. There are no upper floors in the tall building, and this makes it nearly impossible to heat up the space, where winter temperatures on average hover around 0 degrees Celsius. Also the rectangular stable-shape might not be particularly functional for music and theatre events.

External links

 Gylddendal, Den Store Danske Encyklopædi
 Infosposter by the Centre
 http://naturstyrelsen.dk/naturoplevelser/undervisning/naturskoler/midtjylland/karlsladen-besoegscenter/
 Historian Vilfred Friborg Hansen, http://www.friborghansen.dk/index.php

Tourist attractions in Denmark
Tourist attractions in the Central Denmark Region
Buildings and structures in Syddjurs Municipality